The 1923 National Amateur Cup was the USFA's first attempt to stage a national knockout competition strictly for amateur soccer teams. This edition however did not reach a conclusion and no overall winner was crowned. The tournament suffered numerous delays. Among the worst instances was an early round game between Swedish Americans of Chicago and Gary, Indiana scheduled for mid December. Poor field conditions due to bad weather prevented the completion of their matchup until the end of March. Consequently no national final or semifinals were played. Ten years prior, the USFA's earlier incarnation, the AAFA, had conducted two tournaments on the amateur level. Both were successful in the sense that they were completed expeditiously however they were able to draw few if any teams from beyond the New York area. The 1923 amateur tournament drew 68 teams ranging from Chicago, Illinois to Rumford, Maine including even a team from San Francisco, California, the Olympic Club though their entry was rejected as a matter of logistics.

New England

Eastern Pennsylvania

NY-NJ

Ohio-West PA

Illinois-Michigan 

Quarterfinals

See also
1922-23 National Challenge Cup
1923 American Cup

References 

Amer
National Amateur Cup